Okçular can refer to:

 Okçular, Alaplı
 Okçular, Bartın
 Okçular, Çan
 Okçular, Çubuk
 Okçular, Dinar
 Okçular, Ilgaz
 Okçular, Karacabey
 Okçular, Karakoçan
 Okçular, Kovancılar